The 1947 Cal Poly Mustangs football team represented California Polytechnic State College —now known as California Polytechnic State University, San Luis Obispo—as a member of the California Collegiate Athletic Association (CCAA) during the 1947 college football season. Led by Howie O'Daniels in his 11th and final season as head coach, Cal Poly compiled an overall record of 1–9 with a mark of 0–5 in conference play, placing last out of six teams in the CCAA. The team lost its final eight games and was outscored by its opponents 332 to 97 for the season. The Mustangs played home games at Mustang Stadium in San Luis Obispo, California.

Schedule

References

Cal Poly
Cal Poly Mustangs football seasons
Cal Poly Mustangs football